Peter Rohr (born 4 February 1945) is a former Swiss alpine skier.

Career
During his career he has achieved 5 results among the top 10 (one podium) in the World Cup.

World Cup results
Top 10

References

External links
 
 

1945 births
Living people
Swiss male alpine skiers
Place of birth missing (living people)